Tylomelania sarasinorum is a species of freshwater snail with an operculum, an aquatic gastropod mollusk in the family Pachychilidae.

The specific name sarasinorum is in honor of Swiss naturalists Paul Sarasin and Fritz Sarasin, who described 20 Tylomelania species from Sulawesi.

Distribution 
This species occurs in Malili Lakes, Sulawesi, Indonesia. Its type locality is lake Towuti, Loeha Island.

Ecology 
Tylomelania sarasinorum is a lacustrine species.

The females of Tylomelania sarasinorum usually have 1-14 embryos in their brood pouch. Newly hatched snails of Tylomelania sarasinorum have a shell height of 0.5-8.5 mm.

References

sarasinorum
Gastropods described in 1913